, officially , is a district of Chiyoda, Tokyo, Japan. As April 1, 2007, its population is 246. Its postal code is 101-0022.

Kanda-Neribeichō is located on the northeastern part of Chiyoda. It borders Akihabara, Taitō to the north, Kanda-Matsunagachō to the east, Kanda-Aioichō, and Soto-Kanda to the west.

Education
 operates public elementary and junior high schools. Izumi Elementary School (和泉小学校) is the zoned elementary school for Kanda-Neribeichō. There is a freedom of choice system for junior high schools in Chiyoda Ward, and so there are no specific junior high school zones.

References

Districts of Chiyoda, Tokyo